Apseudella is a monotypic genus of crustaceans belonging to the monotypic family Apseudellidae. The only species is Apseudella typica.

The species is found in Eastern Africa.

References

Tanaidacea
Monotypic crustacean genera